The 1913–14 Yorkshire Cup was the ninth occasion on which the Yorkshire Cup competition, a Rugby league tournament, was held. This season there were no junior/amateur clubs taking part, no new entrants and no "leavers" and so the total of entries remained the  same at thirteen. This in turn resulted in three byes in the first round.

This year saw a previous two-time winner, Huddersfield taking the trophy by beating Bradford Northern by the score of 19–3 in the final. The match was played at Thrum Hall, Halifax, now in West Yorkshire. The attendance was 12,000 and receipts were £430. This was Huddersfield's fourth appearance in what would be seven appearances in eight consecutive finals between 1909 and 1919 (which included four successive victories and six in total), and who knows, but for the intervention of the First World War and suspension of the competition, it may have been more. It was also the first of the four consecutive wins.

Background 

The Rugby Football League's Yorkshire Cup competition was a knock-out competition between (mainly professional) rugby league clubs from  the  county of Yorkshire. The actual area was at times increased to encompass other teams from  outside the  county such as Newcastle, Mansfield, Coventry, and even London (in the form of Acton & Willesden. The Rugby League season always (until the onset of "Summer Rugby" in 1996) ran from around August-time through to around May-time and this competition always took place early in the season, in the Autumn, with the final taking place in (or just before) December (The only exception to this was when disruption of the fixture list was caused during, and immediately after, the two World Wars).

Competition and Results

Round 1 
Involved  5 matches (with three byes) and 13 clubs

Round 2 – quarterfinals 
Involved 4 matches and 8 clubs

Round 3 – semifinals  
Involved 2 matches and 4 clubs

Final

Teams and scorers 

Scoring - Try = three (3) points - Goal = two (2) points - Drop goal = two (2) points

The road to success

Notes  
1 * Highest winning margin at the time (beating Bradford's 68–2 victory over Bramley in 1906

2 * Thrum Hall was the home ground of Halifax with a final capacity of 9,832 (The attendance record of 29,153 was set on 21 March 1959 for a third round Challenge Cup tie v  Wigan). The club finally moved out in 1998 to take part ownership and ground-share with Halifax Town FC at The Shay Stadium.

See also 
1913–14 Northern Rugby Football Union season
Rugby league county cups

References

External links
Saints Heritage Society
1896–97 Northern Rugby Football Union season at wigan.rlfans.com
Hull&Proud Fixtures & Results 1896/1897
Widnes Vikings - One team, one passion Season In Review - 1896-97
The Northern Union at warringtonwolves.org

RFL Yorkshire Cup
Yorkshire Cup